The Milker's Mishap is a very early short 1897 comedy film about a man milking a Holstein, which becomes frisky and kicks over the milker and the pail of milk. The man blames some farm hands, and a quarrel ensues.

External links

1897 films
American black-and-white films
1897 comedy films
American silent short films
Silent American comedy films
American comedy short films
Films about cattle
1897 short films
1890s American films